"Let Me Love You" is a song recorded by French DJ and electronic music producer DJ Snake featuring vocals from Canadian singer Justin Bieber. The song was released through Interscope Records on 5 August 2016 as the third single from his debut studio album, Encore (2016). The artists both co-wrote the song along with Andrew Watt, Ali Tamposi, Brian Lee and Louis Bell, while the song's production was handled by DJ Snake, Bell and Watt.

Its music video, directed by James Lees, was released on 29 November 2016 on YouTube. In 2021, the song was covered by American nu metal group Love and Death featuring Lacey Sturm. The song became popular among teenagers and young adults in 2017. It also received  a nomination for Best Crush Song at the Disney Awards.

Composition
"Let Me Love You" is written in the key of C minor with a tempo of 100 beats per minute common time. The song follows a chord progression of Cm7EE/GAE/GA.

Music video
The music video for "Let Me Love You" was released on 29 November 2016 on YouTube. Rolling Stone magazine referred to the video as "Bonnie and Clyde with a twist" as it shows a few scenes with a outlaw couple (played by Tommy O'Brien and Emily Rudd) engaging in a high speed chase, a run in with a mob boss and kissing in their getaway car and in their motel room. In the end, it is revealed that the action sequences are part of a video game and the players on the other side are in fact a kid and an unkempt and overweight adult male with virtual reality devices on. The video was directed by James Lees. The official music video has over 1 Billion views on YouTube as of 13 September 2021. The lyric video uploaded by Proximity has also racked up over 1 Billion views on the site.

Chart performance
In the United States, "Let Me Love You" debuted at number 12 on the Billboard Hot 100 on the issue dated 27 August 2016. The single opened at number-one on Digital Songs with 113,000 downloads, becoming DJ Snake's first and Bieber's sixth number-one on the chart. On the issue dated 1 October 2016, "Let Me Love You" advanced at sixth place, becoming DJ Snake's third top 10 single in the Hot 100 after "Turn Down for What" and "Lean On" with Major Lazer and Bieber's twelfth top 10 single. It eventually reached number four the following week.

In addition, the song reached number one in Finland, France, Germany, Italy, the Netherlands, Norway, Portugal, Scotland and Switzerland; as well as the top 10 in Argentina, Australia, Austria, Belgium, Brazil, Canada, Denmark, Hungary, Ireland, Lebanon, New Zealand, Panama, Paraguay, Poland, Spain, Sweden, the United Kingdom and the United States.

The remix of the song with the collaboration of American R&B singer R. Kelly debuted at number 24 on the Bubbling Under Hot 100 on the issue dated 14 January 2017. The remix opened at number 11 on Hot Dance/Electronic Songs with 25,000 downloads.

Covers
On 1 October 2022, Fastball released their cover of the song exclusively on their Patreon website.

Charts

Weekly charts

Original version

Remix featuring R. Kelly

Year-end charts

Decade-end charts

Certifications

References

External links
 

2016 songs
2016 singles
DJ Snake songs
Justin Bieber songs
Songs written by Justin Bieber
Songs written by Ali Tamposi
Songs written by Brian Lee (songwriter)
Dutch Top 40 number-one singles
Number-one singles in Finland
SNEP Top Singles number-one singles
Number-one singles in Germany
Number-one singles in Italy
Number-one singles in the Netherlands
Number-one singles in Norway
Number-one singles in Portugal
Number-one singles in Scotland
Number-one singles in Switzerland
Torch songs
Songs written by Andrew Watt (record producer)
Tropical house songs
Songs written by Louis Bell
Songs written by DJ Snake
Song recordings produced by Louis Bell
Interscope Records singles